Tomicus piniperda, the common pine shoot beetle, is a bark beetle native throughout Europe, northwestern Africa, and northern Asia. It is one of the most destructive shoot-feeding species in northern Europe.

Its primary host plant is Scots pine Pinus sylvestris, but it also uses European black pine P. nigra, maritime pine P. pinaster, eastern white pine P. strobus, red pine P. resinosa, jack pine P. banksiana and other pines to a small extent, and more rarely on spruce Picea and larch Larix.

Description

It is black or dark brown, 3.5–4.8 mm long, with a cylindrical body, rounded at the head and abdomen ends. It breeds in recently dead and dying trees, most often windblown trees lying on the ground but also in e.g. fire-killed standing trees. The adults tunnel a breeding gallery in spring, up to 25 cm long, parallel to the wood grain, where they lay their eggs. On hatching, the larvae chew through the phloem radially from the gallery for several months, emerging as new adults in late summer. The adults then feed through the autumn and winter on the pith in strong apical shoots of healthy young trees, killing the bored-out shoots. This does not kill the tree, but causes damage to the growth form, reducing the economic value of the timber by reducing growth rates and stem straightness. There is one generation per year, with most adults dying after breeding many times, though a few survive to breed again a year later. Unlike most bark beetles, Tomicus piniperda does not use pheromones for pre-breeding association and pairing, but instead homes in on the resin scent emitted by damaged specimens of the host species.

Taxonomy
Species closely related to Tomicus piniperda include Tomicus minor (lesser pine shoot beetle), with a similar distribution but ecologically separated, using standing dead pines and with its breeding galleries across the grain, not parallel to it; Tomicus destruens in the Mediterranean region, which differs in details of ecology, infesting primarily stone pine P. pinea and maritime pine P. pinaster; and Tomicus yunnanensis in southwestern China on Yunnan pine Pinus yunnanensis. Historically, these species were often not distinguished from T. piniperda, but they are reproductively isolated, which has consequences for pest control.

Invasive problems
The beetle has been introduced accidentally to northeastern North America, where it has become an invasive species. The first known occurrence in North America was found in July 1992 at a Christmas tree farm close to Cleveland, Ohio, from where it has spread to 11 states in the United States and to Ontario and Quebec in Canada. The beetle has been identified as a serious pest in the United States.   As a precautionary step to help protect pine plantations, a United States federal quarantine was introduced in 1992 in the northeast and north-midwest, regulating movement of pine logs and bark, nursery stock, and Christmas trees from infested to uninfested areas, and a similar quarantine brought in to cover part of southeast Canada in 1993 by the Canadian authorities.

Fungal associations
As with all bark beetle species, this species is known to associate with a wide range of fungal taxa. However, there is little clarity regarding the existence of symbiotic relationships between this beetle species and the fungal species that make up its mycobiota.

References

External links
 pine shoot beetle on the University of Florida / Institute of Food and Agricultural Sciences Featured Creatures website
 Species Profile - Common Pine Shoot Beetle (Tomicus piniperda), National Invasive Species Information Center, United States National Agricultural Library. Lists general information and resources for Common Pine Shoot Beetle.

Scolytinae
Insect pests of temperate forests
Insect vectors of plant pathogens
Beetles described in 1758
Taxa named by Carl Linnaeus